Mojotoro is an album by  Argentine musician Dino Saluzzi recorded in 1991 and released on the ECM label.

Reception
The Allmusic review by Ron Wynn awarded the album 3 stars stating "The music mixes tango with elements of Bolivian and Uruguayan music. There are some beautiful sections, and some uneven ones as well".

Track listing
All compositions by Dino Saluzzi except as indicated
 "Mojotoro" - 9:05   
 "Tango a Mi Padre" - 2:41   
 "Mundos" - 10:58   
 "Lustrin" - 6:17   
 "Viernes Santo" - 4:46   
 "Milonga (La Puñalada)" (Pintín Castellanos) - 3:41   
 "El Camino" - 5:32   
Recorded Estudios Ion in Buenos Aires, Argentina in May 1991

Personnel
Dino Saluzzi — bandoneón, percussion, voice
Celso Saluzzi — bandoneon, percussion, voice
Felix ´Cuchara´ Saluzzi — tenor saxophone, soprano saxophone, clarinet
Armando Alonso — guitars, voice
Guillermo Vadalá — electric bass, voice
José Maria Saluzzi — drums, voice
Arto Tuncboyaci — percussion, voice

References

ECM Records albums
Dino Saluzzi albums
1992 albums
Albums produced by Manfred Eicher